Stephen Clement Gunnlaugson, known as Steve Gunn, (November 11, 1890 – March 8, 1914) was a professional ice hockey player. He played with the Toronto Blueshirts of the National Hockey Association. He appeared in 3 games for the Blueshirts in the 1912–13 season, scoring one goal.

References

External links
Steve Gunn at JustSportsStats

1890 births
1914 deaths
Canadian ice hockey left wingers
Ice hockey people from Manitoba
Sportspeople from Brandon, Manitoba
Toronto Blueshirts players